Eurya is a genus of about 70 species of flowering plants in the family Pentaphylacaceae.

Fossil record

Several fossil seeds of Eurya stigmosa have been described from Middle Miocene strata of the Fasterholt area near Silkeborg in central Jutland, Denmark. Eurya macrofossils have also been described from late Zanclean strata of the Pliocene in Pocapaglia,  Italy. Seed fossils of Eurya stigmosa were also reported from the Early Pleistocene (Calabrian stage) of Madeira Island (Atlantic Ocean, Portugal)

Species
 Eurya emarginata
 Eurya japonica Thunb.
 Eurya rapensis F.Brown
 Eurya rengechiensis Yamamoto (Taiwan)
 Eurya sandwicensis A.Gray - Ānini (Hawaii)

The leaves of Eurya are eaten by caterpillars of some Lepidoptera, such as the engrailed (Ectropis crepuscularia).

References

 
Ericales genera
Taxonomy articles created by Polbot